Unipol Arena (previously known as Futurshow Station, PalaMalaguti and originally Palasport Casalecchio) is an indoor sporting arena located in Casalecchio di Reno, Province of Bologna, Italy. The seating capacity of the arena for basketball games is 11,000 people, and the seating capacity for concerts is 20,000 people. It was opened in December 1993. It was home to the Virtus Bologna basketball team from 1996 to 2017.

It is served by Casalecchio Palasport railway station.

History
During the year 2008, the arena had restyling works, which included a new museum dedicated to Virtus' history, four new JumboTrons, new white seats and black stairs, and new white parquet. In October 2011, the arena changed its name to the current Unipol Arena, in a name sponsorship marketing deal, which was scheduled to last through 2016.

In summer 2016, the capacity of the arena for basketball games increased from 8,650 up to 11,000. Other museums were also built, one dedicated to Futurshow, and one dedicated to Luciano Pavarotti.

Entertainment

See also
List of indoor arenas in Italy

References

External links

 

1993 establishments in Italy
Basketball venues in Italy
Indoor arenas in Italy
Sports venues completed in 1993
Sports venues in Bologna
Virtus Bologna